.rw is the Internet country code top-level domain (ccTLD) for Rwanda.

Second-level domains

In addition to registering a Rwanda domain name directly under .rw, RICTA, through accredited and registered registrars, offers as well the following second level domains:

Accredited registrars
As of February 17, 2021, accredited registrars include:

 101 DOMAIN INC.
 Africa Olleh Services
 AFRIREGISTER Ltd
 Brain Technologies
 BSC Ltd
 Cloud web
 CYUDA Ltd
 GALAXY GROUP Ltd
 GO Ltd
 Hostholik Ltd
 Igihe Ltd
 imaginet Rwanda Ltd
 Inyarwanda Ltd
 Ispa  Ltd
 Marcaria
 Markmonitor Inc
 MTN Rwanda
 The Click
 Web4Africa
 Webspace LTD

References

External links 
 IANA .rw whois information
 .rw domain registration website 

Country code top-level domains
Communications in Rwanda

sv:Toppdomän#R